Baring Head Lighthouse is a concrete lighthouse at Baring Head in the Wellington Region of the North Island of New Zealand, with an LED beacon powered by mains electricity. It is owned and operated by Maritime New Zealand, and can be accessed via walking tracks in the southern area of the East Harbour Regional Park, south of Wainuiomata.

The lighthouse was built to be the main approach light to Wellington Harbour, as well as a coastal light for Cook Strait. Lit on 18 June 1935, it replaced the light at Pencarrow Head, which was decommissioned later that year. The lighthouse was initially powered by a diesel generator but was converted to mains electricity in 1950. The 1000 W light was fully automated in 1989 and demanned.

See also 

 List of lighthouses in New Zealand

References

External links 
 
 
 Lighthouses of New Zealand Maritime New Zealand

Lighthouses completed in 1935
Lighthouses in New Zealand
Buildings and structures in Lower Hutt
Cook Strait
1930s architecture in New Zealand
Wellington Harbour
Transport buildings and structures in the Wellington Region